The 1962–63 Czechoslovak Extraliga season was the 20th season of the Czechoslovak Extraliga, the top level of ice hockey in Czechoslovakia. 12 teams participated in the league, and ZKL RH Brno won the championship.

First round

Final round

7th–12th place

External links
History of Czechoslovak ice hockey

Czech
Czechoslovak Extraliga seasons
1962 in Czechoslovak sport
1963 in Czechoslovak sport